"Diamant" is a song by Swiss singer Luca Hänni. It was written by Mathias Ramson, Lukas Loules, Nebil Latifa and Choukri Gustmann for his yet-to-be-titled fifth studio album. The song was released as a digital single on 22 May 2020 by Muve Recordings. "Diamant" peaked at number 65 on the Swiss Singles Chart.

Critical reception
Jonathan Vautrey of Wiwibloggs said, "A contemporary pop track with an almost tropical rhythm, Hänni sings to his loved one and compares them to a sparkling diamond."

Music video
A music video to accompany the release of "Diamant" was first released onto YouTube on 11 June 2020. The music video features Christina Luft, his professional dancing partner from when Hänni finished third in the thirteenth season of the German talent series Let's Dance.

Track listing

Personnel
Credits adapted from Tidal.
 Mathias Ramson – Producer, composer, mixing engineer
 Choukri Gustmann – Composer 
 Lukas Loules – Composer
 Nebil Latifa – Composer

Charts

Release history

References

2020 singles
2020 songs
Luca Hänni songs
Songs written by Lukas Loules